Libanopsis is a genus of extinct sphinid beetles described from fossils preserved in Lebanese amber. Libanopsis lived in Lebanon in the Early Cretaceous. The genus contains five species, all discovered in the same year: Libanopsis impexa, Libanopsis limosa, Libanopsis poinari, Libanopsis slipinskii, and Libanopsis straminea.

References 

Sphindidae
Cucujoidea genera
Prehistoric beetle genera
Barremian life
Fossils of Lebanon
Fossil taxa described in 2015